Arthur Maingot (24 February 1862 – 7 December 1928) was a Trinidadian cricketer. He played in four first-class matches for Trinidad and Tobago from 1910 to 1920.

See also
 List of Trinidadian representative cricketers

References

External links
 

1862 births
1928 deaths
Trinidad and Tobago cricketers